Some notable battles involving war elephants include:
331 BC, Battle of Gaugamela
326 BC, Battle of the Hydaspes River
317 BC, Battle of Paraitakene
316 BC, Battle of Gabiene
312 BC, Battle of Gaza
 305-303 BC, Mauryan-Selecuid War
301 BC, Battle of Ipsus
280 BC, Battle of Heraclea
279 BC, Battle of Asculum
275 BC, Battle of Beneventum
272 BC, Siege of Sparta
265-264 BC, Kalinga War
262 BC, Siege of Agrigentum
255 BC, Battle of Tunis
251 BC, Battle of Panormus
238 BC, Battle of Utica
238 BC, Battle of "The Saw"
239 BC, Battle of the Bagradas River
219-218 BC, Siege of Saguntum
218 BC, Crossing of the Alps and the Battle of Trebia
217 BC, Battle of Raphia
207 BC, Battle of the Metaurus
202 BC, Battle of Zama
200 BC, Battle of Panium
197 BC, Battle of Cynoscephalae
190 BC, Battle of Magnesia
167-160 BC, Revolt of the Maccabees
164 BC, Battle of Beth-zur
153 BC, Roman siege of Numantia (Spain)
149-146 BC, Siege of Carthage
108 BC, Battle of the Muthul
46 BC, Battle of Thapsus
363, Battle of Samarra, other skirmishes between Shapur and Julian in his invasion of Persia
451, Battle of Vartanantz
634, Battle of the Bridge
636, Battle of al-Qādisiyyah
738, Caliphate campaigns in India
1040, Battle of Dandanaqan
1214, capture of Cremona by Frederick II, Holy Roman Emperor
1277 After the battle of Ngasaunggyan, Kublai Khan captured his first war-elephants.
1402, Battle of Ankara, Timur's forces defeated Ottomans and Ottoman Civil War began.
1526, First Battle of Panipat
1556, Second Battle of Panipat
1659, Battle of Khajwa
1761, Third Battle of Panipat
1825, Battle of Danubyu

Elephants, war
Elephants, battle
War elephants

de:Kriegselefant#Schlachten